Mouse is a thriller South Korean television series  starring Lee Seung-gi, Lee Hee-joon, Park Ju-hyun, and Kyung Soo-jin. The series, directed by Choi Joon-bae and Kang Cheol-woo and written by Choi Ran, follows the confrontation of police officer Jeong Ba-reum (Lee Seung-gi) with a serial killer. It premiered on tvN on March 3, 2021, and aired every Wednesday and Thursday at 22:30 KST till May 20.

The series was ranked 3rd hottest drama for the first half of 2021 based on KT's online video service (OTT) Seezn. It is placed at 5th rank in tvN's all time Wednesday and Thursday series (based on paid platform integrated with cable, IPTV and satellite/provided by Nielsen Korea).

Background
The scriptwriter was inspired by the Incheon Elementary School Murder case in 2017.

"I want the defendant to know how precious our youngest child was..." said the mother of the victim child who attended the trial. Unfortunately, that did not happen.

When the victim's mother asked the defendant what was the hardest thing right now, the defendant's answer was not sorry or guilt. Instead, the defendant said, "The weather is nice, but it's the hardest for me not to see cherry blossoms.“

The whole nation was shocked and furious at the defendant's response. Perhaps it is natural for the defendant to give such an answer. After all, the defendant was born with a different gene from ours, the "Psychopathic Gene". Psychopaths have the same brain as ordinary human beings, but without a mirror neuron. They neither feel the pain of others, nor can they perceive feelings such as guilt, sympathy, compassion, or regret. Therefore, we cannot expect repentance or atonement from the defendant. That's why the defendant could not understand that the child she brutally murdered was, in fact, precious to his parents.

Victims' families can only spend their entire lives in pain while the perpetrators spend the rest of their lives trying to kill. They have the genes that enable them to turn a blind eye to what they have done and live comfortably, without feeling even 1% of the remorse or guilt that they should have felt and that gives rise to unbearable rage.

The scriptwriter planned the drama in this backdrop. The psychopaths are the ones who believe in what they have done. As the scriptwriter wanted to see psychopath murderers feel the pain, reflect on their actions, and atone. Even if there's only a slight chance that they will feel empathy, they should understand their sins sincerely and feel remorse. That would be the best punishment and salvation for the psychopathic murderers.

Synopsis
Mouse fantasizes the scenario, what if psychopaths can feel remorse and guilt for their actions. It follows Jeong Ba-reum (Lee Seung-gi), a steadfast police officer, whose life changes when he encounters a psychopathic serial killer. This drives him and his partner Go Moo-chi (Lee Hee-joon) to unearth the truth behind psychopathic behaviours. This also raises the questions, whether it is possible to scan a psychopath in the mother's womb using fetal genetic testing? And if the child in the womb is a psychopath, will it be wise to have that child?

Cast

Main
 Lee Seung-gi as Jeong Ba-reum, a police officer whose life changes after a confrontation with a psychopathic serial killer.
 Lee Hee-joon as Ko Moo-chi, a detective who does not care about the rules and is willing to resort to any method to catch criminals.
  as young Ko Moo-chi
  as teen Ko Moo-chi
 Park Ju-hyun as Oh Bong-yi, a tough-looking high school senior who lives with her grandmother and practices martial arts daily. Though she doesn't excel much at school, she is confident, tough, and always straightforward. However, she is a character with a deep past.
 Kyung Soo-jin as Choi Hong-ju, a talented production director of a reality TV program known as "Sherlock Hong-ju" at channel OBN.

People around Jeong Ba-reum

Ba-reum's friends
 Lee Seo-jun as Na Chi-guk, a new prison guard at Mujin Detention Center. 
He is best friends with Ba-reum since high-school.
 Woo Ji-hyun as Gu Dong-gu, a prison guard and Ba-reum and Chi Kook’s friend. 
He was in the same class with Ba-reum and Chi-guk at a private academy to get prepared for the civil servant examination though he did not pass as easily as his friends.

People around Ko Moo-chi
 Kim Young-jae as Ko Moo-won, Moo-chi's elder brother
 	 as young Ko Moo-won
He is a priest temporarily housed in the basement of a church. When he was young, he was miraculously saved from being killed by a rare killer, but he became disabled since then. However, he was isolated from his younger brother Ko Moo-chi. Seeing Moo-chi who destroys life with vengeance, he is heartbroken and always prays for his younger brother.

People around Oh Bong-yi
 Kim Young-ok as Kim Gat-nam, Bong-yi's grandmother
She always urges Bong-yi to marry Ba-reum, whom she considered a good bachelor in the neighborhood because she thinks it would be safe for her granddaughter to marry a police officer. Ten years ago, she thought that Bong-yi was the target of the crime because of herself, and she has lived with guilt. But she always appears to be energetic in front of her granddaughter.

Police Station
 Pyo Ji-hoon as Shin Sang, a freshman detective working under detective Go Moo-chi.
The precious late-born only son. The only thing that wraps around him is the brand-new luxury brands! Although he became a police officer with his own ability, he is teased to be a “parachute” by Moo-chi because his father is a president candidate. His father made the deciding vote against the Kill Psychopath Fetus Bill in 1995.

 Ahn Nae-sang as Park Du-seok, Head of the Military Manpower Administration Evidence Storage Team.
He was a successful homicide detective, but a word he said to the killer headhunter during the 1995 "headhunter serial murder" dropped his life into the abyss. Afterwards, he stepped down to take care of his sick wife, and was appointed as the team leader of the first new evidence storage team in Korea, forming a team with Moo-chi thereafter.

  as Bok Ho-nam, Leader of the Mujin Bokbu Police Station Violent Team. 
He has been suffering from stress and hair loss due to Moo-chi, who brings him trouble every day. As Du-seok's freshman, the "headhunter serial murder" was his first case in 1995 as a freshman. He is the person who knows the pain and suffering of Du-seok better than anyone else and comforts him.

  as Gang Gi-hyeok, Detective Inspector. 
A late cop. Moo-chi is the reason for him to join the police force, and he is elder than Moo-chi. Although they used to be colleagues who could not survive without each other, he wanted Moo-chi to quit the police officer more than anyone else after an incident. However, in his heart, he cherishes Moo-chi more than anyone else and wishes for his happiness.

 Kim Min-soo as Lee Min-soo, Detective. 
To put it in a good word, he is a cool guy, but he is actually rude. He keeps an appropriate distance from everyone and never gets close with anybody. When he was in high school, he was in an unrequited love with a girlfriend who was later killed by a murderer. He then became a police officer with determination.

  as Woo Jae-pil, Du-seok's former partner

Others

 Ahn Jae-wook as Dr. Han Seo-joon, a genius neurosurgeon doctor at Guryong Hospital. 
He is an all-round handsome man with excellent speech, manners, and a good sense of humor. He is always the first to be invited in TV broadcast and lectures with a lot of followers. When a woman he loved was killed by a robber during his study in England, he returned to Korea and met Ji-eun while concentrating on his work. He married Ji-eun and had a child, and he was looking forward to the birth of "Blessings." There were so many things that he wanted to do and dreamed of when "Blessings" was born. But with the Headhunter serial murder, his dream plan with "Blessings" was shattered...

 Kim Jung-nan as Sung Ji-eun, Dr. Han's wife. 
Although she was a flower-loving florist, she is taking a break from work and concentrating on prenatal education due to Seo-joon, who is worried about her late pregnancy. She wanted to have a child who looked exactly like her husband, and eventually the child whom the two had hoped so much for came as a "Blessing". She always thought that her family of three would be happy, but a few days before the expected delivery of "Blessing", something tragic happened, and the happiness she dreamed of was shattered...

 Kwon Hwa-woon as Sung Yo-han, an emergency medical resident at Mujin Hospital. 
He is the youngest doctor in Korea to pass the state examination.

 Jo Jae-yoon as Daniel Lee, a doctor of genetics and a criminologist 
He is a nominee for the Nobel Prize in Physiology or Medicine. He is a Korean-British man who was adopted to the United Kingdom as a child and was raised by British parents. Han Seo-joon, who discovered Daniel's genius at Cambridge University Hospital where Daniel was working as a cleaner, gave him the opportunity to study in college and work at a genetic research institute. Since then, Seo-joon and he have been like brothers and made friendship. They conducted successful research to identify fetal psychopathic genes, getting on a highly secretive flight to Korea...

 Jung Eun-pyo as Kang Deok-soo, a child sex offender
 Song Jae-hee as Woo Hyung-chul, Jae-pil's son and a lawyer
 Yoo Yeon as Hyung-chul's mother
 Shin Ha-young as Song Soo-jung
 Kim Kang-hoon as Jae-hoon
 Seo Woo-jin as younger Jae-hoon: A mysterious child born in 1995 whose family is murdered one day making him a key suspect in the case.
 Son Woo-hyeon as Kim Joon-seong, Yo-han's classmate and friend
 Jung Ae-ri as Choi Young-shin, a corrupt Secretary General in the Blue House who voted in favour of the Kill Psychopath Fetus Bill in 1995 though it was not passed.
  Kim Ha-eon as Kim Hankok, a kidnapped kid.
  Cherish Maningat as Hankook's mother.
 Go Woo-ri as Jennifer Lee, Daniel Lee's sister and Han's former girlfriend
 Kang Mal-geum
  as Chi-guk's mother. This was the last drama role portrayed by Cheon before her death from low blood pressure and kidney failure at the age of 52 (in Korean age) on 28 April 2021.
 Jin Seo-yeon
 Ma Dong-seok
 Kim Yo-han as brain transplant patient (Ep.20)

Production
In April 2020, Lee Seung-gi  and Choi Jin-hyuk were offered to star in the series. In June Lee Seung-gi was confirmed to play a rookie police officer. 935 Entertainment reported on August 4 that Park Ju-hyun was considering positively to appear in the drama. YG Entertainment announced on October 21, that Kyung Soo-jin is positively reviewing the joining of cast of the drama.

On October 29, reports revealed P.O will be starring in the new tvN drama, after he was spotted attending the script reading, and a rep from the network confirmed, "It's true that P.O will be starring in the new drama 'Mouse'."

Release
On July 1, 2021, an international festival dedicated to television series from around the world, announced the line-up for its 2021 Program taking place in Lille, France, on August 26-September 2, 2021. The line-up included Mouse, where it will have its first French premiere in the international panorama category to be chaired by Florence Aubenas. On July 28, 2021, it was announced that Mouse will be included in the "2021 K-format Virtual Screenings in the US” held by KOCCA. Major U.S. networks and production companies like Warner Bros., HBO Max and Lionsgate, as well as producers and directors in Hollywood will also take part in the event.

Original soundtrack

Part 1

Part 2

Part 3

Part 4

Part 5

Part 6

Part 7

Reception

Audience Viewership

The drama broke the record for the highest viewership ratings among all tvN's Wed-Thur dramas in more than two years. It has also continued to place #1 in its time slot across all channels among the 20-49 age demographic. In its finale, the real-time online viewership rate of TVING on the Korean network platform hit a record high of 90.6%.

Awards and nominations

Notes

References

External links
  
 
 
 Mouse at Daum 
 Mouse at Naver 

TVN (South Korean TV channel) television dramas
2021 South Korean television series debuts
Korean-language television shows
Television productions postponed due to the COVID-19 pandemic
South Korean thriller television series
2021 South Korean television series endings
Television series about fictional serial killers